Li Yang (born 31 March 1980 in Tonghua, Jilin) is a Chinese ski jumper who has been competing since 2004. At the 2006 Winter Olympics, he finished 16th in the team large hill and 44th in the individual normal hill events.

Li's only World Cup finish was 37th in a large hill event in Japan in 2006. His best career finish was third in a Continental Cup normal hill event in Germany in 2006.

External links

1980 births
Living people
Chinese male ski jumpers
Olympic ski jumpers of China
People from Tonghua
Ski jumpers at the 2006 Winter Olympics
Skiers from Jilin
Ski jumpers at the 2011 Asian Winter Games